Nikolai Grozni, (born Nikolay Grozdinski, March 28, 1973) is a multilingual Bulgarian-American novelist, short-story writer and musician.

Background
Grozni was born in Sofia, Bulgaria.  After being accepted to the National Music School "", he trained to become a concert pianist, winning his first  in Salerno, Italy, in 1983. Following the political changes after the fall of the Berlin Wall, in 1992 Grozni left Bulgaria to study Jazz and composition at Berklee College of Music, Boston.

In 1995, Grozni left for India to become a Buddhist monk. He spent four years in Dharamsala, studying at the Institute of Buddhist Dialectics before joining Drepung Monastery in South India in 1999, where he stayed for six months. The five years he spent in India would become the inspiration for his three works in Bulgarian, as well as for his memoir in English: "Turtle Feet: The making and unmaking of a Buddhist monk."  Grozni holds an MFA in creative writing from Brown University.

Grozni and his wife, Danielle Trussoni, were featured in an episode of Season 2 of This American Life (TV), in which he discussed his dislike of mowing the lawn.

Writing

Lives of Idle Men and Degenerate Mystics. (short stories, published in Bulgarian in 2000)
Asleep In the Great Emptiness. (a novel, published in Bulgarian in 2001)
Someone put a Spell on Existence. (a novel, published in Bulgarian in 2002)
Turtle Feet, New York Times Editor’s Choice (memoir, Riverhead, 2008) 
Wunderkind (a novel, Free Press, 2011)
Farewell, Monsieur Gaston (a novel, East West, 2014)
Claustrophobias (short stories, Begemot, 2016)
 Heliotropes (poems, Begemot, 2020)
 Songs for the Dust (poetry collection, 2021)

Grozni's short fiction has appeared in The Guardian, The Seattle Review, and Harper's Magazine.

Reviews
 New York Times: Turtle Feet
 Asleep in the Great Emptiness
 People Magazine:Turtle Feet
 Brown Alumni Magazine: Turtle Feet
 Lives of Idle Men and Degenerate Mystics
 Christian Science Monitor: Turtle Feet

Interviews
 BCS News Magazine
 Powell's Books
  Brown Alumni Magazine
 Lives of Idle Men and Degenerate Mystics

References

External links

 Author's website
 New York Times: The Ghost of Revolutions Past''.' (OP-ED Contributor, February 14, 2011)
 Asleep In the Great Emptiness,Someone put a Spell on Existence 
 Three Bulgarian books
 published short story in The Guardian
 Bulgarian writings
 Berklee studies
 International Writing Program in Iowa, 2001 (bio)
 
 Wunderkind publication
 Brown University Alumni Magazine
 Turtle Feet NYT editors’ choice

1973 births
Living people
21st-century American novelists
American male novelists
Bulgarian novelists
Bulgarian male writers
Writers from Sofia
Berklee College of Music alumni
21st-century American male writers
21st-century Bulgarian novelists